The European School Ljubljana is a co-educational, Accredited European School in Ljubljana, Slovenia that serves students age 6 to 18. It was established in 2018 and is part of the Ljubljana School Centre. In the 2019/20 academic year the school offered programs in English and Slovene, and language instruction in French, German, Lithuanian, and Spanish. The school is certified to offer the European Baccalaureate as its secondary leaving qualification.

Location 
The school is located in Ljubljana's Center District in the premises of the Ljubljana School Centre, housed in a former Austro-Hungarian trade school built in 1911. The immediate surroundings include the University of Ljubljana's Faculty of Pharmacy to the west, the Faculty of Arts to the north, the French embassy to the east, and residential housing to the south. A section of the wall from the Roman colony of Emona stands immediately south of the school.

See also
Accredited European School
European Baccalaureate
European Schools

References

External links 

About Accredited European Schools

Accredited European Schools
Schools in Ljubljana
Primary schools in Slovenia
Secondary schools in Slovenia
International schools in Slovenia
Educational institutions established in 2018
2018 establishments in Slovenia